German submarine U-2529 was a Type XXI U-boat (one of the "Elektroboote") of Nazi Germany's Kriegsmarine, built for service in World War II. She was ordered on 6 November 1943, and was laid down on 29 September 1944 at the Blohm & Voss yard at Hamburg, as yard number 2529. She was launched on 13 November 1944, and commissioned under the command of Oberleutnant zur See Karl-Heinrich Feufel on 22 February 1945.

Design
Like all Type XXI U-boats, U-2529 had a displacement of  when at the surface and  while submerged. The submarine was powered by two MAN SE supercharged six-cylinder M6V40/46KBB diesel engines each providing , two Siemens-Schuckert GU365/30 double-acting electric motors each providing , and two Siemens-Schuckert silent running GV232/28 electric motors each providing .

U-2529 was fitted with six  torpedo tubes in the bow and four  C/30 anti-aircraft guns. She could carry twenty-three torpedoes or seventeen torpedoes and twelve mines. The complement was five officers and fifty-two men.

Service history
On 9 May 1945, U-2529 surrendered at Kristiansand, Norway. She was later transferred to Lisahally, Northern Ireland on 3 June 1945, arriving on 6 June 1945.

Post-war service
The Tripartite Naval Commission allocated U-2529 to the Soviet Union. On 4 December 1945, she arrived in Libau, Latvia, as British N-class N27. On 13 February 1946, the Soviet Navy allocated her to the Baltic Fleet. She was renamed B-27 on 9 June 1949 then sent to the reserve fleet on 10 June 1955. B-27 was redesignated on 19 September 1955, as a block ship BSh-28, then on 9 January 1957, as training hulk UTS-3. She was finally struck from the Soviet Navy on 1 September 1972, and broken up for scrap.

References

Bibliography

External links
 

Type XXI submarines
U-boats commissioned in 1945
World War II submarines of Germany
1944 ships
Ships built in Hamburg